Liberation before education was a slogan of some activists in South Africa from 1976 in rejecting the education offered black children in Apartheid-era South Africa.

References

External links
 From apartheid in education to no education without liberation
 Spotlight on missing link in apartheid writing

Apartheid in South Africa
South African political slogans